Sturmiodexia is a genus of parasitic flies in the family Tachinidae. There is one described species in Sturmiodexia, S. rubescens.

Species
Sturmiodexia muscaria (Walker, 1853)
Sturmiodexia rubescens Townsend, 1919

References

Dexiinae
Diptera of South America
Tachinidae genera
Taxa named by Charles Henry Tyler Townsend